These are the results of the men's C-2 1000 metres competition in canoeing at the 1948 Summer Olympics.  The C-2 event is raced by two-man sprint canoes and was held on August 12.

Final
With only eight teams competing, a final was held.

The Belgian team did not finish due to a man falling overboard during the final.

References

1948 Summer Olympics official report. p. 316.
Sports reference.com 1948 C-2 1000 m results

Men's C-2 1000
Men's events at the 1948 Summer Olympics